Declan Breathnach (born 3 June 1958) is a former Irish Fianna Fáil politician who served as a Teachta Dála (TD) for the Louth constituency from 2016 to 2020.

Early life
A native of Knockbridge, Dundalk, Breathnach was educated at Dundalk CBS (now Coláiste Rís) and St Patrick's College (which has become a part of Dublin City University), where he earned a Bachelor of Education. He has worked within primary schools for 35 years as a teacher and principal.

Political career
Breathnach has been a member of Fianna Fáil since his early teens. He has served as a Cumann Secretary, member of the officer board of Louth Comhairle Dáil Ceantair (constituency council) and as the Louth constituency representative on the Fianna Fáil National Executive, a position held up until his election as a member of Louth County Council in 1991. Since Breathnach's first election to Louth County Council in 1991, he successfully retained his seat for 25 years, across 5 elections. 

He served as Joint Chairperson of the Memorandum of Association between Down Council and Louth Council from 2010 to 2015. He has also been a member of the East Border Regions committee. He has also served as the Chairperson of the Louth County Council Special Policy Group on Infrastructure, European and Cross-Border Matters. 

Breathnach served as a Louth County Councillor until 2016. He successfully contested the Louth constituency at 2016 general election, receiving 9,099 first preference votes (13.5%). He previously contested the Louth constituency at 2011 general election but was not elected.

Breathnach was the Fianna Fáil Spokesperson on North-South Bodies & Cross-Border Co-Operation and is also Vice-Chairman of the Oireachtas Joint Committee on the Implementation of the Good Friday Agreement. He also served as Vice-Chairperson of the British–Irish Parliamentary Assembly.

Breathnach lost his Dáil seat at the 2020 general election, leaving the Louth constituency without a Fianna Fáil TD for the first time in the history of the state. He also contested the 2020 Seanad election, but was unsuccessful. 

On 9 July 2020, Breathnach formally apologised to Sinn Féin President Mary Lou McDonald regarding a tweet from 11 October 2018. The tweet, posted on the second anniversary of the murder of Garda Tony Golden, has been deleted since. The tweet accused McDonald of being a hypocrite and condoning the deaths of multiple Gardaí, the settlement included a formal apology to McDonald but other terms were kept confidential.

References

1958 births
Living people
Fianna Fáil TDs
Heads of schools in Ireland
Irish schoolteachers
Local councillors in County Louth
Members of the 32nd Dáil
People from Dundalk